Lester Johnson may refer to:

 Lester Johnson (politician) (1901–1975), U.S. Representative from Wisconsin
 Lester Johnson (artist) (1919–2010), American artist